Hewlett is a hamlet and census-designated place (CDP) in the Town of Hempstead in Nassau County, on Long Island, in New York, United States. The population was 6,819 at the 2010 census.

Hewlett is usually included as one of the Five Towns in the southwestern corner of Nassau County. In the context of the Five Towns, "The Hewletts" or "Hewlett" is often used to refer collectively to the hamlet of Hewlett, together with the villages of Hewlett Bay Park, Hewlett Harbor and Hewlett Neck, along with Woodsburgh.

History 
The hamlet's name comes from the Hewlett family. George Hewlett, the first Hewlett to settle in the area, was born in England in 1634. He was part of an English community which emigrated to Long Island - by way of Connecticut - and negotiated treaties with the Dutch governors and native inhabitants to establish a population center in what is now Hempstead.

Geography

Demographics

As of the census of 2010, there were 6,819 people, 2,547 households, and 1,833 families residing in the CDP. The population density was 7,936.0 per square mile (3,062.8/km2). There were 2,708 housing units at an average density of 3,074.4/sq mi (1,186.5/km2). The racial makeup of the CDP was 86.2% White, 2.8% African American, 0.2% Native American, 7.8% Asian, 0.1% Pacific Islander, 4.6% from other races, and 1.6% from two or more races. Hispanic or Latino of any race were 10.67% of the population.

There were 2,634 households, out of which 33.4% had children under the age of 18 living with them, 62.9% were married couples living together, 9.0% had a female householder with no husband present, and 24.8% were non-families. 22.1% of all households were made up of individuals, and 10.5% had someone living alone who was 65 years of age or older. The average household size was 2.67 and the average family size was 10.7.

The median age was 44.2 years. Females comprised 52% of the population, and males comprised 48% of the population

The median income for a household in the CDP was $66,550, and the median income for a family was $74,259. Males had a median income of $51,977 versus $40,750 for females. The per capita income for the CDP was $38,803. 2.9% of the population and 1.3% of families were below the poverty line. Out of the total people living in poverty, 2.8% were under the age of 18 and 5.9% were 65 or older.

Transportation
The Hewlett station on the Long Island Rail Road's Far Rockaway Branch is located within the hamlet.

Education

Public education 
Hewlett is primarily located within the boundaries of (and is thus served by) the Hewlett-Woodmere School District (District 14), although smaller portions of the hamlet are located within the boundaries of (and are thus served by) the Lynbrook Union Free School District. As such, students who reside within Hewlett and attend public schools go to school in one of these districts depending on where they live within the hamlet.

Private education 
The Yeshiva of South Shore is located in Hewlett.

Notable people
 Deborah Asnis – Infectious disease specialist, discovered and reported the first human cases of West Nile virus in the United States.
 Jeffrey Bader – Former Senior Director for Asia, National Security Council, Obama Administration; US Ambassador to Namibia; and member, Hewlett-Woodmere High School Alumni Hall of Fame.
 Ross Bleckner – Artist.
 John P. Campo – Thoroughbred racehorse trainer.
 Louise Glück – Poet, essayist and 2020 Nobel Prize in Literature laureate.
 Harvey Milk – American politician and LGBT advocate; Hewlett High School Teacher.
 Errol Morris – Film director.
 Max Seibald – Lacrosse player.
 Jim Steinman – Composer, lyricist, record producer and playwright.

References

External links

 Hewlett - Woodmere Union Free School District
 The Hewletts: A Four-Part Segment of the Five Towns

Five Towns
Census-designated places in New York (state)
Census-designated places in Nassau County, New York
Hamlets in Nassau County, New York